Dexopollenia is a genus of flies in the family Polleniidae.

Species
Dexopollenia aurantifulva Feng, 2004
Dexopollenia bicolor Malloch, 1935
Dexopollenia bicoloripes Malloch, 1931
Dexopollenia chrysothrix Bezzi, 1927
Dexopollenia disemura Fan & Deng, 1993
Dexopollenia fangensis Kurahashi, 1995
Dexopollenia flava (Aldrich, 1930)
Dexopollenia geniculata Malloch, 1935
Dexopollenia hirtiventris Malloch, 1935
Dexopollenia luteola (Villeneuve, 1927)
Dexopollenia maculata (Villeneuve, 1933)
Dexopollenia monsdulitae (Senior-White, Aubertin & Smart, 1940)
Dexopollenia nigra Kurahashi, 1987
Dexopollenia nigriscens Fan, 1992
Dexopollenia papua Kurahashi, 1987
Dexopollenia sakulasi Kurahashi,1987
Dexopollenia testacea Townsend, 1917
Dexopollenia tianmushanensis Fan, 1997
Dexopollenia trifascia (Walker, 1861)
Dexopollenia uniseta Fan, 1992
Dexopollenia yuphae Kurahashi, 1995

References

Polleniidae
Brachycera genera
Diptera of Australasia
Diptera of Asia